Dreaming Out Loud is a 2007 album by OneRepublic.

Dreaming Out Loud may also refer to:

 Somniloquy, the act of talking in one's sleep
 Dreaming Out Loud (film), a 1940 film directed by Harold Young
 Dreamin' Out Loud, a 1996 album by Trace Adkins
 Dreaming Out Loud, a 2006 album by The Radiators

See also
Dream Out Loud (disambiguation)